Bouffard may refer to:
 Auguste-Désiré Bouffard (1854–1916), a French agronomist
 Édouard Bouffard (1858–1903), a lawyer and political figure in Quebec
 Jean Bouffard (1800–1843), a notary and political figure in Lower Canada
 Léon Bouffard (1893–1981), a Swiss pole vault athlete
 Scarlet Mae Bouffard Garcia (1985–2008), a Filipino glamour model